The Gangbyeon Expressway is an eight-lane highway located in Seoul, South Korea. It is part of National Route 46 and National Route 77. The highway is directly connected with the Jayu Motorway (자유로) in the border city located on the Gayang Bridge. The Mapo Bridge–Namyangju section has been designated as National Route 46, while the Yanghwa Bridge–Goyang section is specified as National Route 77. The highway is the main arterial road that connects northern Seoul with satellite cities such as Goyang, Paju, and Namyangju.

History
Construction of the expressway began in 1969, and it opened in 1972. In 1985, it was extended to Haengju Bridge and Cheonho Bridge. At the time the road was completed, it had sections with two, three, and four lanes. 

After rapid economic growth and the 1988 Summer Olympics the road was the site of chronic traffic jams. An expansion project began in 1989 and was completed in 1998.

In 2012, Seoul City was expanded and road improvement projects were proposed to the Gangbyeon Expressway, including the underground relocation of the road construction.

List of facilities 
 IC: Interchange, JC: Junction, SA: Service Area, TG:Tollgate
 (■): National Route 77
 (■): National Route 46

See also
List of streets in Seoul
Olympicdaero

1969 establishments in South Korea
Roads in Seoul
Roads in Gyeonggi